Renatus Boniface Njohole (born 16 June 1980, in Dar es Salaam) is a Tanzanian footballer who plays club football for FC Bavois.

International career
He holds 3 international caps for the Tanzania national football team.

References

1980 births
Living people
People from Dar es Salaam
Tanzanian footballers
Tanzania international footballers
Tanzanian expatriate footballers
Expatriate footballers in Switzerland
Yverdon-Sport FC players
Association football midfielders